These railroads were bought, leased, or in other ways had their track come under ownership or lease by the Central Railroad of New Jersey.

The Central Railroad of New Jersey was consolidated into Conrail.

The Allentown Terminal Railroad, Bay Shore Connecting Railroad, Beaver Meadow, Trescow and New Boston Railroad, New York and Long Branch Railroad and Raritan River Railroad were partly owned by the CNJ.

American Dock and Improvement Company
Bayonne Port Terminal
Buena Vista Railroad
Carteret Extension Railroad
Carteret and Sewaren Railroad
Central Railroad of Pennsylvania
Easton and Western Railroad
Constable's Hook Railroad
Cumberland and Maurice River Railroad
Bridgeton and Port Norris Railroad (succeeded November 30, 1878)
Cumberland and Maurice River Extension Railroad
Dover and Rockaway Railroad (leased April 26, 1881)
Elizabeth Extension Railroad
Freehold and Atlantic Highlands Railroad
Atlantic Highlands Railroad
Freehold and New York Railway (consolidated January 8, 1890?)
Monmouth County Agricultural Railroad
Keyport Railroad (consolidated January 8, 1890?)
Hibernia Mine Railroad (leased September 30, 1910)
High Bridge Railroad (leased)
Taylor Iron Works
Lafayette Railroad
Lake Hopatcong Railroad
Lehigh and Wilkes-Barre Coal Company
Long Valley Railroad
Longwood Valley Railroad
Manufacturers' Railroad
Manufacturers' Extension Railroad
Mauch Chunk, Summit Hill and Switchback Railway
Mauch Chunk Switch-Back Railway
Middle Brook Railroad
Middle Valley Railroad
Mount Hope Mineral Railroad (bought February 1930)
Navesink Railroad
New Jersey Southern Railway
New Jersey Southern Railroad
Kent County Railroad (leased) (later reassigned to PRR)
Long Branch and Sea-Shore Railway (leased)
Maryland and Delaware Railroad (leased) (later reassigned to PRR)
Pemberton and New York Railroad (leased) (later reassigned to PRR)
Raritan and Delaware Bay Railroad (succeeded September 14, 1869)
Toms River Railroad (leased)
Toms River and Waretown Railroad (leased)
Vineland Railway (leased)
Vineland Railroad (succeeded March 30, 1877)
New Jersey Terminal Railroad
Newark and Elizabeth Railroad
Newark and New York Railroad (leased)
Newark Warehouse Company
Ogden Mine Railroad (leased January 1, 1882)
Passaic River Extension Railroad
Perth Amboy and Elizabethport Railroad (consolidated 1873)
Raritan North Shore Railroad
Somerville and Easton Railroad (consolidated February 22, 1849?)
Elizabeth and Somerville Railroad (consolidated February 26, 1847?)
Sound Shore Railroad
South Branch Railroad
Toms River and Barnegat Railroad
Vineland Branch Railway
West End Railroad
West Side Connecting Railroad
Wharton and Northern Railroad (bought February 1930)
Hibernia Branch Railroad (consolidated December 7, 1905)
Morris County Railroad (consolidated December 7, 1905)
Charlotteburg and Green Lake Railroad (bought 1888)
Green Pond Railroad (succeeded August 17, 1876)
Morris County Connecting Railroad (consolidated December 7, 1905)
Port Oram Railroad (consolidated December 7, 1905)
Wilkes-Barre and Scranton Railway (leased May 1, 1888)

References
Railroad History Database
Conrail family tree (PDF)